Albert Bollinger (November 22, 1870 – February 14, 1933) was an American politician, lawyer, and businessman.

Biography 
Bollinger was born in Steeleville, Illinois. He was admitted to the Illinois bar in 1893 and lived in Waterloo, Illinois with his wife and family. He served in the Illinois Senate from 1897 to 1901 as a Republican. Bollinger served as the master of the Monroe County Chancery Court since 1904. He also helped organized the Waterloo First National Bank. He died from heart problems at his home in Waterloo, Illinois.

Notes

External links

1870 births
1933 deaths
People from Randolph County, Illinois
People from Waterloo, Illinois
Businesspeople from Illinois
Illinois lawyers
Republican Party Illinois state senators